Events from the year 1741 in Denmark.

Incumbents
 Monarch – Christian VI
 Prime minister – Johan Ludvig Holstein-Ledreborg

Events

 13 January – The Conventicle Act of 1741 is enacted.
 6 May  HDMS Elephanten is launched at the Royal Danish Dockyard.

Undated
The Copenhagen Stocks House is opened to civilian prisoners.

Culture
 Ludvig Holberg's Niels Klim's Underground Travels is published.

Births
 3 February – Charlotte Elisabeth Henriette Holstein, courtier (died 1809)
 16 February – Margrethe von der Lühe, courtier (died 1826)

Full date unknown
 Cornelius Høyer, miniatures painter (died 1804)

References

 
Years of the 18th century in Denmark
Denmark
Denmark
1740s in Denmark